Avetik Hovhannesi Sahakian (1863–1933), also known as Father Abraham, was an Armenian politician, the Parliamentary President (speaker) of the First Republic of Armenia in 1918–19, the social security minister and member of ARF Dashnaktsutiun Eastern Bureau. He was also known as agricultural scientist.

Biography
Sahakian was born in Jalaloghly, Tiflis Governorate (present-day Stepanavan, Armenia). He was included in Western Armenian liberation activities (since 1898) and ARF Caucasian project. He married Varvara Sahakyan, who became one of the first three women elected to parliament in Armenia in 1919. He became Chairman of Parliament in 1918.

Hovannisian describes Avetik Sahakian in The Republic of Armenia, Vol. II:Avetik Sahakian, affectionately called “Father Abraham” in party circles, was at fifty-four the dean of the cabinet. A native of Jalal-oghli and a graduate of the Petrovsk Agricultural Academy in Moscow, he had been employed in municipal and technical agencies in the Caucasus and had earned distinction for his work on control of the boll weevil. He had been a member of the Dashnaktsutiun Bureau and several national bodies before the 1917 revolutions, then served as provisions minister in the Transcaucasian Federation, and, after moving to Erevan with many comrades in the summer of 1918, became a mainstay in the Khorhurd during the first trying months of Armenian independence.Following the Bolshevik takeover of Armenia in 1920, Sahakyan was imprisoned. Following his release, the couple and their children fled on foot to Tabriz in Persia, before settling in Iraq. However, the climate affected Varvara's health, and the family relocated to Beirut. He died in 1933.

Books
Nersisian, Ashot. Aprogh herosner: Avetik Sahakian, Yerevan, 2004 (in Armenian)

References

1863 births
1933 deaths
Armenian nationalists
People from Stepanavan
People from Tiflis Governorate
Armenian Revolutionary Federation politicians
People of the First Republic of Armenia
Ministers of Social Protection of the First Republic of Armenia